Jamie Jackson (born January 24, 1967) is an Australian actor and stand-up comedian who has appeared in film, stage and television. His television appearances include Water Rats, The Blacklist, and Flight of the Conchords.

Jackson studied acting at the National Institute of Dramatic Art in Sydney, and attended the NYU Tisch School of the Arts, where he studied musical theatre writing under the tutelage of Sarah Schlesinger. He also studied standup comedy at the American Comedy Institute with Stephen Rosenfield.

In 2015, he was part of the ensemble cast of the Broadway musical production of Doctor Zhivago.

In 1998 he was awarded and Associate Fellowship through Mike Walsh Fellowships.

Recently he’s been in Wicked and Sweeney Todd: The Demon Barber of Fleet Street on Broadway as Doctor Dillamond and Judge Turpin.

Filmography

Stage

References

External links
 
 Official website
 Jamie Jackson on Backstage.com
 Jamie Jackson on TV Guide
 Actor Jamie Jackson attends the after party for the Broadway opening of "Soul Doctor" at the Liberty Theatre on Getty Images
 Actor Jamie Jackson attends the after party for the Broadway opening of "Soul Doctor" at the Liberty Theatre on Livingly Media

Australian male television actors
Living people
1970 births